Mohamed Abdul Mageed Qubaty FRCS, GONOC is a Yemeni politician. Previously, he served as Yemen's Minister of Tourism, Chairman of the Yemen Tourism Promotion Board (YTPB), Vice President of the Arab Tourism Organization and Vice President of the UN World Tourism Organization Commission for the Middle East. He also served as Yemen's Minister of Information and Mass Media. Known for "practicing politics with a scalpel" due to being one of the most successful surgeons in the country as well as an influential orator, he is one of Yemen's most famous political figureheads and led the opposition front during the Arab Spring. He is currently the Chairman of the Southern Civil Democratic Rally (MAGD-SCDR).

He has held previous political positions such as the Senior Political Advisor to the previous three Yemeni Prime Ministers (2007-2011) and the Ambassador of Yemen to Lebanon and Cyprus (2003-2007).

There was a failed attempt to assassinate him on 11 September 2012, which targeted the minister's motorcade, next to the Council of Ministers in Sana'a, Yemen under the guise of a terrorist attack marking the 11th anniversary of the September 11 attacks. Dr. Qubaty was injured and the suicide bombing led to the death of eight bodyguards whilst injuring others.

Early life
He is married to Faten Mohamed Kaid Saif, Yemen's first female chartered accountant and the current political advisor to the Yemeni Prime Minister. She is the daughter of General Mohamed Kaid Saif (Vice President of Yemen, Deputy Commander-in-Chief and member of the Yemeni Revolutionary Command Council of 26 September 1962). They have three children: Shady, Alya and Basem.

Education
 Primary and Secondary:  Aden, Beirut and Cairo (GCE 'O' & 'A' Levels).
 Undergraduate Degree:  MB, BS, King's College, University of London, 1980. LRCP, England, 1980. 
 Postgraduate: MSc, King's College, Cambridge, 1984. MRCS, England, 1986. FRCS, Edinburgh, 1989. PhD, University of London, 1989.

Medals and prizes

 The Lebanese National Cedar Medal, Order of the Grand Officer (GONOC), 2007.
 Aden University's Medal, 1995.
 Medal of Scientific Excellence, Aden, 1983.
 London University's Prize, 1980.

Career

 Yemen's Minister of Tourism and Chairman of the Yemen Tourism Promotion Board (YTPB), 2018–2020
 Vice President of the Arab Tourism Organization.
 Vice President of the UN World Tourism Organization Commission for the Middle East.
 Yemen's Minister of Information and Mass Media, 2015.
 Member of the National Dialogue Conference, 2013.
 Senior Political Advisor to the Prime Minister with the rank of Minister, 2008–2011.
 Chairman of the Foreign Relations and International Cooperation Department of the Ruling GPC Party, Yemen, 2009–2010.
 Member of the Supreme Media Committee of the Ruling (GPC), Party, 2009–2010.
 Founding Member, The Southern Civil Democratic Rally, (MAGD-SCDR), 2009.
 Ambassador Extraordinary and Plenipotentiary of Yemen to Lebanon and Cyprus 2003–2007.
 Political Advisor to the Prime Minister with the rank of Minister, 2001–2003.
 Professor, University of Sana'a, 1991.
 Founding Member and External Affairs Secretary, the Yemeni British Friendship Association, 1992.
 Vice Chairman of the Supreme Political Committee and Member of the Supreme Media Committee of the Ruling GPC Party, Yemen, 2001–2003.
 Member of the General Secretariat and Chairman of the Political and Foreign Relations Committee of the Ruling GPC Party, 2000–2003.
 Advisor to the Presidium of the Yemeni Parliament with the rank of Minister, 1996–2000.
 Member of the Permanent Committee and Secretary of the Supreme Political Committee and Member of the General Secretariat of the Ruling GPC Party, Yemen, 1996–2000.
 Advisor to the Services Committee of the Yemeni Parliament with the rank of Vice Minister, 1990–1996.
 Senior Lecturer, University of London, 1986–1990.
 Advisor to the Cabinet with the rank of Vice Minister, Aden, Yemen, 1983–1984.
 Secretary of the Yemeni Diplomats Forum, Aden, Yemen, 1983–1984.
 President of the UK Union of Arab Students, 1980–1982.
 Secretary of the Yemen Socialist Party Organizations in Western Europe, 1978–1985.
 General Secretary of the University of London Students' Union, 1977–1979.

Publications 

 Co-author of the book "Yemen and the World", Madbooli Publications, Cairo, 2001.
 Co-author of the book "Yemen and the Major International Powers", Information and Research Center of Sabaa, Sana'a, 2003.
 Main speaker at the Oxford University Symposium; the proceedings of which have been published in a book entitled "Citizenship and Democracy in the Arab Countries", Centre for Arab Unity studies, Beirut, 2001.
 Published and presented more than thirty scientific papers in medical conferences, symposia and journals in the UK, USA and the Arab World.
 Published and presented more than forty papers in the fields of political science, education, economics, modern and contemporary Yemeni history, covering areas related to democratisation, local government, party and parliamentary institutions, educational reform, the impact of IT, privatisation, Yemeni–European and Yemeni–American relations, etc.

References

1958 births
Living people
Alumni of King's College London
Alumni of King's College, Cambridge
21st-century Yemeni politicians
Information ministers of Yemen
Tourism ministers of Yemen
People from Aden Governorate
Bahah Cabinet
Bin Dagher Cabinet
First Maeen Cabinet